Mars and Venus with Cupid is a 1663 oil on canvas painting by Luca Giordano, now in the National Museum of Capodimonte in Naples.

The painting, of discreet workmanship, does not constitute a work of primary importance by Giordano. The outlines of the figures in the painting are very approximate to the layout of the scene and the same is compressed and not perfectly balanced. In addition, the canvas has excessive points of light that disharmony the composition.

References
 Luca Giordano, 1634–1705, Editrice Electa (2001)  

1663 paintings
Paintings by Luca Giordano
Paintings of Venus
Paintings of Mars (mythology)
Paintings in the collection of the Museo di Capodimonte